The North Carolina Courage is a professional women's soccer team based in Cary, North Carolina. It was founded on January 9, 2017, after Stephen Malik acquired National Women's Soccer League (NWSL) franchise rights from the Western New York Flash. The Courage is affiliated with the men's team North Carolina FC of the United Soccer League and plays its home games at the Sahlen’s Stadium at WakeMed Soccer Park.

In 2018, the Courage became the first team in NWSL history to win the Shield and the Championship in the same season. In 2019, the team became the first team to win the Championship on its home field.

History

2017

On January 9, 2017, the North Carolina Courage announced their formation as the relocated Western New York Flash, with a new home of Cary, North Carolina. The Courage officially hired Paul Riley, the Flash's coach prior to relocation, on January 30, 2017. The team played their first match, on April 15, 2017, against the Washington Spirit, and won 1–0 with a goal by McCall Zerboni. The Courage went on to win the 2017 NWSL Shield and advanced to the 2017 NWSL Championship after defeating the Chicago Red Stars 1–0 in the semifinals, but fell 1–0 to the Portland Thorns in the finals.

2018

In 2018, the Courage had the best season in NWSL history, losing just one of 26 games played during the season. The Courage also participated in and won the inaugural Women's International Champions Cup. Heather O'Reilly scored the only goal in the victory over Olympique Lyon. After clinching the NWSL Shield, the team defeated the Portland Thorns in the 2018 NWSL Championship 3–0. Jessica McDonald was named the NWSL Championship MVP after scoring two goals in the match.

2019

The Courage returned to the Women's International Champions Cup finals, but were defeated by returning finalists Olympique Lyon. The Courage were crowned NWSL Champions for the second consecutive season after defeating the Chicago Red Stars, 4–0 in the 2019 NWSL Championship held in Cary, North Carolina. Debinha was named the NWSL Championship MVP after scoring the fastest goal in NWSL Championship history. The team clinched the NWSL Shield for the third time in as many years on September 21 after defeating Utah Royals FC.

2020

With the NWSL season cancelled due to the COVID-19 pandemic, the Courage participated in the inaugural 2020 NWSL Challenge Cup. They were defeated in the semifinals by Portland Thorns FC. The Courage also participated in the 2020 NWSL Fall Series, finishing in fifth place.

2021

On January 28, 2021, the club announced that professional tennis player Naomi Osaka had made an investment in the team. Osaka stated that she was inspired to take part ownership by those who had invested in her during her career, and that she wishes to "continue the legacy of women empowerment."

The Courage failed to qualify for the 2021 NWSL Challenge Cup championship, falling one point short in the East Division to NJ/NY Gotham FC.

On September 30, 2021, the club fired head coach Paul Riley after news of prior sexual abuse allegations emerged against him. The Courage replaced Riley with assistant Sean Nahas in the interim.

2022

On December 1, 2021, the Courage named former interim head coach Sean Nahas as head coach for the 2022 season.

Team name, crest, and colors 
The team's name is a nod to the original Carolina Courage – who won the 2002 Women's United Soccer Association (WUSA) Founders Cup – as is the stylized lioness image, which matches the head of the lioness on the WUSA team's badge with very minor alterations.  The badge features elements from the flag of North Carolina with both the star and the color scheme, the latter keeping in line with the NCFC brand. The lower right point of the star represents the Research Triangle, a geographical region that includes Chapel Hill, Durham, and Raleigh. The Courage's primary colors include "Atlantic blue", "cardinal red," and "Southern gold."

Uniform evolution
Home

Away

Sponsorship

Stadium 

The North Carolina Courage play their home games at WakeMed Soccer Park, a soccer-specific stadium owned by Wake County and operated by the Town of Cary. The team shares the venue with North Carolina FC, a USL League One team also owned by Stephen Malik.

The soccer complex consists of a purpose-built main stadium, two lighted practice fields, and four additional fields. The main stadium and the two lighted fields (2 & 3) are all FIFA international regulation size (120 yards x 75 yards). The main stadium seats 10,000 with the expansions of 2012. Field 2 also has 1,000 permanent bleacher seats.

The park is on  that the State of North Carolina has leased to Wake County. Money to build the soccer park came from $14.5 million in county-wide hotel room and prepared food and beverage taxes. The Town of Cary assumed responsibility for operations and maintenance in 2004 from Capital Area Soccer League. On January 26, 2006, the Town of Cary council amended its lease to allow it to sublet the property to Triangle Professional Soccer through the year 2011 for the exclusive promotion of professional soccer and lacrosse events at the complex. This deal was extended for the new ownership group through 2014.

Future stadium proposal 
On December 6, 2016, along with a name change, North Carolina FC announced plans for a housing and multi-use stadium development — originally announced as seating 24,000, then scaled down to 20,000 seats — in Raleigh, North Carolina, as part of the men's team's bid for a Major League Soccer (MLS) expansion franchise. Team owner Stephen Malik and real-estate developer John Kane led investment in the proposal, purchasing 88 acres of land in 2019 and estimating the total project cost to be $1.9 billion. The MLS expansion bid was put on hold in 2021 along with the stadium plans as the COVID-19 pandemic consumed municipal funding. The project gained former BioAgylitix CEO Jim Datin as an investor in June 2022.

Year-by-year

Players

Current squad

Staff

Head coaching history

Honors
NWSL Championship
Winners (2): 2018, 2019
Runners-up (1): 2017
NWSL Shield
 Winners (3): 2017, 2018, 2019
NWSL Challenge Cup
 Winners (1): 2022Women's International Champions CupWinners (1): 2018Runners-up' (1): 2019

 Broadcasting 

In 2019, the NWSL broadcast partnership with A&E was terminated a year early, all games would be streamed on Yahoo! Sports in the United States and on the NWSL website for international viewers.

In 2018, Courage games continued to be streamed on Go90, the NWSL website and select games were broadcast on Lifetime. After Go90 was shut down by Verizon on July 30, all games were available for streaming on the NWSL website.

In 2017, Courage games were streamed exclusively by Go90 for American audiences and via the NWSL website for international viewers. As part of a three-year agreement with A&E Networks, Lifetime broadcasts one NWSL Game of the Week on Saturday afternoons. In 2017 season, the Courage were featured in national Lifetime NWSL Game of the Week''  broadcasts on June 3, July 1, August 19, and July 15, 2017.

See also

 List of professional sports teams in the United States and Canada
 List of top-division football clubs in CONCACAF countries

References

External links
 
 Courage Country

 
National Women's Soccer League teams
Women's soccer clubs in North Carolina
Soccer clubs in North Carolina
2016 establishments in North Carolina
Association football clubs established in 2016
Sports in Wake County, North Carolina
USL W League teams